The 1945–46 Swedish Division I season was the second season of Swedish Division I. Hammarby IF defeated Sodertalje SK in the league final, 2 games to 1.

Regular season

Northern Group

Southern Group

Final
Hammarby IF – Södertälje SK 2–1, 1–5, 2–0

External links
 1945–46 season

1
Swedish Division I seasons
Swedish